Heinrich Ludwig Hermann Müller (23 September 1829 – 25 August 1883) was a German botanist who provided important evidence for Darwin's theory of evolution.

Career 

Müller was an early investigator of coevolution.p27 He was the author in 1873 of Die Befruchtung der Blumen durch Insekten, a book translated at the suggestion of Darwin in 1883 as The Fertilisation of Flowers. He and Darwin corresponded; 36 letters between the two, or from Darwin concerning Müller, are recorded. Darwin cited him extensively in The Descent of Man for his information relating to the behavior of bees.

Hermann was the brother of Fritz Müller,p29 the German doctor who lived in Santa Catarina, Southern Brazil and researched its natural history. Fritz Müller wrote the first book in support of Darwinian evolution in German,"Für Darwin"; he is also known as the discoverer of Müllerian mimicry. The work of both brothers was well known to Darwin.

Müller was increasingly attacked by conservative circles in Germany for his ideas about evolution. The discussion escalated in 1879 and was even brought to the Prussian Assembly, after Müller had dealt in his teaching with a work by the German Darwinist and popular writer Ernst Krause. Yet, the Prussian state did not dismiss Müller.

Selected publications 

Die Befruchtung der Blumen ([https://archive.org/details/b21900450 The Fertilisation of Flowers], 1883) [Translated by D'Arcy Wentworth Thompson with a Preface by Charles Darwin]

References

Further reading 
 Andreas Daum, Wissenschaftspopularisierung im 19. Jahrhundert: Bürgerliche Kultur, naturwissenschaftliche Bildung und die deutsche Öffentlichkeit, 1848–1914. Munich: Oldenbourg, 1998, 2nd. edition (same page numbers) 2002, including a short biography.

External links 
Darwin's preface to the English translation of The Fertilisation of Flowers

Botanists with author abbreviations
1829 births
1883 deaths
Evolutionary biologists
19th-century German botanists